"You Gots to Chill" is a song by EPMD, released as a single from their 1988 debut album Strictly Business. It reached number 22 on the U.S. R&B chart. The song prominently features a sample from "More Bounce to the Ounce" by Zapp and "Jungle Boogie" by Kool & the Gang. This song is widely considered to be a hip hop classic and has been paid homage by various rappers who have quoted the lyrics to this song in their own music, including Snoop Dogg and LL Cool J, among others. It was number 74 on VH1's 100 Greatest Hip Hop Songs

Music video
The official music video was directed by Adam Bernstein, who would also direct the video for "So Wat Cha Sayin'" a year later.

References

[ Allmusic]

1988 singles
EPMD songs
Songs written by Erick Sermon
Songs written by Roger Troutman
1988 songs
Songs written by PMD (rapper)
Funk-rap songs
Sleeping Bag Records singles

pt:You Gots to Chill